Stephy Tang Lai-yan (born 15 October 1983) is a Hong Kong singer and actress. She was formerly the leader of the Cantopop group Cookies. She won the Hong Kong Film Critics Society Award for Best Actress in 2017 for her performance in The Empty Hands, and was nominated twice for the Hong Kong Film Award for Best Actress.

Early life
Tang is a Hakka of Dongguan ancestry, and is able to speak Hakka, Cantonese and Mandarin. She graduated from Buddhist Sum Heung Lam Memorial College and the Hong Kong Institute of Vocational Education's Department of Fashion Design. 

She represented Hong Kong in volleyball since Form 1 mainly as a left wing spiker or libero, but gave up to pursue a career in the entertainment industry. In March 2015, Tang, who became a fashion label founder/owner (Loey), got sponsorship from the shop to reassemble a women's volleyball team, with herself being a left wing spiker as well as the captain and founder of the team (she cannot become a captain as a libero), and participated in an open-grade C-class qualifications, where it got a record of a win and a loss. She then led Loey to play charity matches against Chinese National Volleyball team, and had trained in Taiwan against secondary school teams in late 2015.

Career

Musical career
In 2002, she started her singing career in the Hong Kong music group Cookies and became the lead singer. The main style of music from Cookies was teen pop. When Tang started her solo singing career, her record company, EMI, wanted a change to a more grown-up look and style. Some songs on her first album, Coloring Stephy, had a more mature and soft jazz influence than her previous music in Cookies. Generally, the album was widely heard and was popular, and it was certified Gold by IFPI Hong Kong.

She sang with Alex Fong in 「好心好報」, 「好好戀愛」, 「十分．愛(合唱版)」 (which won a Jade Solid Gold Award for the best duet in 2006), 「我的最愛」, 「重愛」,「七年」,「同屋主」and 「危城」. She also appeared on TVB's variety show Beautiful Cooking. 

Tang's second solo album was Fantasy. The album had a total of five editions. One was a deluxe edition which contains a DVD featuring her music videos from this album. The only difference between the other four was the color themes of the album covers: red, yellow, blue, and green, which were four different themes for photo shoots.

Her third album is Dating Stephy. This album also features different covers, and a special edition was released three months after the original release. The album also sold as well as her previous two. There was no official announcement of the certification, as Gold Label Entertainment Ltd and EMI Music Hong Kong did not participate in IFPI Hong Kong. However, the newspapers announced that Dating Stephy has sold over 30,000 in one month, and it was at least Gold certified.

In 2007, she performed at the S.U.C.C.E.S.S. Charity Gala at Vancouver, British Columbia, Canada with many other artists.

Tang performed her first headline solo concert, called "Stephy, See Thru Live 2007". It was held from December 7 to 9, 2007 at the Star Hall in Hong Kong. A live album was released featuring songs performed at this concert.

She also did a Mandarin version of "Breaking Free" from High School Musical with Anson Hu.

Tang released her new album The Red Album in November 2008. Some tracks in this album, such as "女兒紅", have led to media attention on the improvement in Tang's voice.

In July 2009, Tang published her first romance novel, Running Alongside Me (陪著我走). The book takes the form of a diary about a girl who has recently broken up with her lover. She goes on a cruise and writes about the things she sees and does. This book also includes 100+ pages of photos, making it a photo book as well.

In December 2009, Tang released her collection of "Greatest Hits" plus "New Songs" songs in a 2CD+ DVD Collection  called 'Music Cafe' which includes four new songs, including Running Alongside Me, which served as the same name as her novel. The collectors edition comes with a mousepad featuring Tang's face that is available in two designs.

In 2011, Tang left her previous record company Gold Typhoon and signed to Neway Star as her new record label.

Acting career
In 2002, Stephy Tang played the role of Kaka in Nine Girls and a Ghost, which starred the full Cookies team and Edison Chen. She also sang the song 不要離我太遠 for the film. The next year she performed in TVB drama series Aqua Heroes, which depicted a youth swimming team, and starred alongside Ronald Cheng in comedy film Dragon Loaded 2003.

Between 2004 and 2016, Tang played the leading roles in several films directed by Patrick Kong, most notably his "Love Quadrilogy" — Marriage with a Fool (2006), Love Is Not All Around (2007), L for Love L for Lies (2008) and Anniversary (2016) — which also starred Alex Fong as the leading actor.

Tang's portrayal of a Karate athlete in The Empty Hands (2017) saw a breakthrough of her acting performance, which earned her the Hong Kong Film Critics Society Award for Best Actress and a nomination for the Hong Kong Film Award for Best Actress. Her performance in My Prince Edward (2020) earned her second nominations in the Hong Kong Film Critics Society Award and the Hong Kong Film Award for Best Actress. She also sang the titular theme song for the film.

In 2020, Tang starred alongside Zeno Koo, Mirror and Error in ViuTV drama series We are the Littles. She portrayed Chiang Ka-yu, a veteran volleyball player-turned coach who trained a novice volleyball team to advance through the top league.

Personal life
Tang and Alex Fong, her on-screen partner in films such as L for Love L for Lies, Love Is Not All Around, Marriage with a Fool and Anniversary, were in a relationship for 10 years. Their relationship was revealed by Mark Lui at his concert at the Hong Kong Coliseum in June 2013. However, on March 15, 2016, Tang and Fong announced the end of their relationship. In 2018, she announced to be in relationship with former JPM member Prince Chiu.

Discography

Cookies
Cantonese albums/EPs
Happy Birthday (2002)
Merry Christmas (2002)
All the Best (2003) - first album as Mini-Cookies
4 Play (2004)
4 in Love (2004)

Karaoke albums
Holidays (2002) 
Channel Cookies (2003)

Mini-concert album
 903 California Red: Eleven Fires Concert (2004)

Solo
Cantonese albums
Coloring Stephy (2005 August 5, 2nd ver:2005 September 28) (Certified Gold 25,000 units shipped in September) 
Stephy Fantasy (2006 March 28, 2nd ver:2006 June 5) (has sold 20,000 copies)
Dating Stephy (2007 February 14, 2nd ver:2007 May 10) (has sold 35,000 copies in May) 
Stephilosophy (2007 December 21) (Certified Gold 20,000 units shipped in December)
The Red Album (2008 November 27) 
Music Cafe (2009 December 23) 
No One Knows (2010 July 15)

Other Albums
 17 May 2006 - All About Women (金牌女兒紅) - Track 05 - Let It Flow, and Track 08 - 偏愛 (with Kary Ng (吳雨霏))
 14 June 2007 - Another Chivas Music Experience Concert Live - Track 10. 愛與痛的邊緣

Filmography

Film

Television

MV Appearance (Actress)

Books
2002 - Delicious Cookies
2006 -  不要忘記 (Bat Yiu Mong Gei)
2007 - Stephy & Alex 十分愛
2008 - 我的最愛Stephy & Alex電影寫真
2008 - 內衣少女電影小說 (La Lingerie Movie Novel)
2009 - 陪著我走 Visual Diary (Pui Jeuk Ngo Zau)
2009 - Heart Sweet 心甜

References

External links 

 
 Stephy Tang at Chinesemov.com

1983 births
Cantonese-language singers
Cantopop singers
Cookies (group) members
21st-century Hong Kong women singers
Hong Kong film actresses
Hong Kong people of Hakka descent
People from Dongguan
Hong Kong television actresses
Living people
21st-century Hong Kong actresses
Hakka musicians
Hong Kong idols